Kashuk-e Olya (also Romanized as Kashūk-e ‘Olyā, Kashūk ‘Olyā, and Kashook Olya; also known as Keshūk-e Bālā, Kashūk Bālā, Kashūk-e Bālā, Keshūk Bālā, and Kishuk) is a village in Jolgeh-e Mazhan Rural District, Jolgeh-e Mazhan District, Khusf County, South Khorasan Province, Iran. At the 2006 census, its population was 29, in 10 families.

References 

Populated places in Khusf County